Weerayut Jitkuntod (born January 2, 1984) is a Thai professional footballer who plays as a right back for Thai League 4 club North Bangkok University.

International career

International

International goals

Honours

Club
TTM Phichit
 Thai Premier League (1) : 2004–05
 Kor Royal Cup (1): 2006

Buriram
 Thailand Division 1 League  (1): 2011

International
Thailand U-23
 Sea Games  Gold Medal (1); 2007

References

External links

1984 births
Living people
Weerayut Jitkuntod
Weerayut Jitkuntod
Association football fullbacks
Weerayut Jitkuntod
Weerayut Jitkuntod
Weerayut Jitkuntod
Weerayut Jitkuntod
Weerayut Jitkuntod
Weerayut Jitkuntod
Weerayut Jitkuntod
Weerayut Jitkuntod
Weerayut Jitkuntod
Southeast Asian Games medalists in football
Weerayut Jitkuntod
Competitors at the 2007 Southeast Asian Games